Denis Scuto (born 13 November 1964) is a retired Luxembourgian football midfielder.

He was voted Luxembourgish Footballer of the Year for the 1987–88 season.

Outside of football he was a teacher, and from 2003 an academic historian at the University of Luxembourg. He took his PhD in 2009.

References

1964 births
Living people
Luxembourgian footballers
Jeunesse Esch players
Association football midfielders
Luxembourg international footballers
21st-century Luxembourgian historians